Tritonia flemingi is a species of dendronotid nudibranch. It is a marine gastropod mollusc in the family Tritoniidae.

Distribution
This species was described from New Zealand. It has been found at Wellington and the Poor Knights Islands.

References

Tritoniidae
Gastropods described in 1937